St Mary's Episcopal Church is a medium-sized church of the Scottish Episcopal Church in Dunblane, Scotland. It is situated by the Fourways roundabout.

St Mary's church was consecrated by Patrick Torry, the Bishop of St Andrews, Dunkeld and Dunblane in 1845. It was listed as Category B in 1971.

Rev Nerys Brown has succeeded  the Rev Nick Green, who succeeded Rev Kimberly Bohan, Canon Janice Cameron, Canon Gianfranco Tellini, Canon John Symon, and many others back to Canon Henry Malcolm, the first Rector of 50 years from 1845.

The church grounds consists of a graveyard, the manse, a medium-sized church hall with kitchen and committee room. A quiet garden will be open to members of the public in early 2014.

References

External links
 Web site for St Mary's in Dunblane

Churches in Stirling (council area)
Category B listed buildings in Stirling (council area)
Listed churches in Scotland
Episcopal church buildings in Scotland
Listed buildings in Dunblane